Achille Lauro (16 June 1887 – 15 November 1982) was an Italian businessman and politician. He is widely considered one of the main precursors of modern populism in Italian politics. He was nicknamed by his supporters Il Comandante ("The Commander").

Biography
Born the fifth of six children of the shipowner Gioacchino and of Laura Cafiero, he was on his part the shipowner and founder of the "Flotta Lauro", based in Southern Italy.

During the decades of Italian Fascist dictatorship (1922–1943), he became a member of the National Fascist Party (PNF) and was named National Counselor of the Chamber of Fasces and Corporations, appointed to this position by Galeazzo Ciano, son-in-law of Benito Mussolini himself, who was active in shipping commerce. Also during this period he was named president of the Naples football club SSC Napoli, where he succeeded Giorgio Ascarelli.

After the end of World War II, following an initial participation in the Common Man's Front, he became active in the Italian monarchist movement led by Alfredo Covelli and financially supported the foundation of the Monarchist National Party (PNM), and was for a long time the mayor of Naples.

In 1972, he joined the neo-fascist party Italian Social Movement (MSI). A square in the coastal town of Sorrento is named after him.

References

 Achille Della Ragione. Achille Lauro superstar: la vita, l'impero, la leggenda. Napoli, 2003.
 Serena Romano. Don Achille, 'o comandante. Milano, 1992.
 Pietro Zullino. Il Comandante. Milano, 1976.

External links 
Achille Lauro

1887 births
1982 deaths
Deputies of Legislature III of Italy
Deputies of Legislature IV of Italy
Deputies of Legislature VI of Italy
Deputies of Legislature VII of Italy
Italian businesspeople in shipping
Italian Democratic Party of Monarchist Unity politicians
Italian Social Movement politicians
Mayors of Naples
Members of the Chamber of Fasces and Corporations
Monarchist National Party politicians
National Fascist Party politicians
National Democracy (Italy) politicians
People from the Province of Naples
People's Monarchist Party (Italy) politicians
Politicians of Campania
Senators of Legislature II of Italy
Senators of Legislature V of Italy